Richard Cooper may refer to:

Sportspeople
Richard Cooper (American football) (born 1964), American NFL player
Richard Cooper (cricketer, born 1945) (1945–1990), English cricketer
Richard Cooper (cricketer, born 1972), English cricketer
Richard Cooper (footballer, born 1965), English footballer
Richard Cooper (footballer, born 1979), English football coach and footballer

Politicians
Sir Richard Cooper, 2nd Baronet (1874–1946), British Conservative politician
Richard Clive Cooper (1881–1940), Irish-Canadian soldier and Unionist politician
Richard M. Cooper (1768–1843), Representative from New Jersey

Artists and Actors 
Richard Cooper, the elder (1701–1764), English engraver 
Richard Cooper Jr. (1740–1822), British artist
Richard Cooper (actor) (1893–1947), British actor
Dick Cooper, musician and writer

Others
Sir Richard Cooper, 1st Baronet (1847–1913), British industrial entrepreneur
Richard Cooper (academic) (born 1947), British academic
Richard Cooper (journalist) (born 1946), American journalist
Richard Cooper (judge) (1947–2005), Federal Court of Australia judge
Richard N. Cooper (1934–2020), economist and policy adviser
Richard S. Cooper (born 1945), American cardiologist and epidemiologist

See also
Richard Couper, English politician